White Label Music is an independent record label based in the UK. The label is run by Marc Hunter and Ann Shenton, who was formerly a member of the band Add N to (X).

Background
Artists include The Asbo Kid (James Atkin of the band EMF), Hiem, Kontour and Large Number (ex Add N to (X)). The label is known for its "Electronic Bible" series of compilation albums including artists such as Jarvis Cocker and Delia Derbyshire of the BBC Radiophonic Workshop.

White Label Music specialises in experimental electronic music and has many artists with varied styles. The label also works alongside the Soyuz major record label based in Russia.

The label also organises the three-day "White Noise Electronic Music Festival" in Cornwall.

Associated artists

 Large Number
 Magnum Quilter
 Pony Harvest
 Vars of Litchi
 Hiem
 The Asbo Kid
 Kontour
 Toffeetronic
 Autorotation
 DJ White Noise
 Tidy Kid
 Downstate
 Wire Mother
 Space Junk Rockers
 Beat Frequency
 Pygmy Globetrotters
 Myheadisaballoon
 The Penny Licks
 Jimmy Spaceman

References

External links
 White Label Music
 White Label Music Official MySpace Page

British record labels
Electronic music record labels